Tineretului (Youth's station in English) is a metro station in Bucharest, Romania, on the Bucharest Metro Line M2.

The station was inaugurated on 6 April 1986 as part of the previously built section of the line, from Piața Unirii to Depoul IMGB. The station is named for the Tineretului Park (Youth's Park) nearby.

References

Bucharest Metro stations
Railway stations opened in 1986
1986 establishments in Romania